Beneath may refer to:

Beneath (2007 film), directed by Dagen Merrill
Beneath (2013 film), a thriller film by Larry Fessenden
Beneath, a 2013 film directed by Ben Ketai
Beneath (Amoral album), 2011
Beneath (Infant Island album)
Beneath (video game), developed by Presto Studios
"Beneath" (The Secret Circle), a television episode
"Beneath" (Young Justice), a television episode